Mount Alvernia (formerly Como Hill) is located on Cat Island in the Bahamas and is the highest point in the country at  above sea level. The mountain shares its name with a school in Montego Bay, Jamaica.

Originally named "Como Hill", it was renamed Mount Alvernia after La Verna, the hill in Tuscany where St. Francis of Assisi received the Wounds of the Cross. The mountain was given its name by a Catholic priest, Monsignor John Hawes, also known as Fra Jerome, who built a hermitage there. Hawes was an Englishman who spent the last 17 years of his life in the Bahamas. He was a qualified architect before entering the church, and did a great deal of architectural work for the church throughout the Bahamas.

References

 The CIA World Factbook

Landforms of the Bahamas
Cat Island, Bahamas
Highest points of countries